Richard Alvin Petitbon (born April 18, 1938) is an American former professional football player and coach in the National Football League (NFL). Petitbon first attended Loyola University New Orleans on a track and field scholarship and left after his freshman year to attend Tulane. After playing college football as a quarterback at Tulane, he played safety for the Chicago Bears from 1959 to 1968, the Los Angeles Rams in 1969 and 1970, and the Washington Redskins in 1971 and 1972. Petitbon recorded the second most interceptions in Bears history with 38 during his career, trailing Gary Fencik. Petitbon also holds the Bears record for the longest interception return, after scoring on a 101-yard return against the Rams in 1962. , he also holds the Bears record for the most interceptions in a game (3 against the Green Bay Packers in 1967) and most interception return yards in a season (212 in 1962).

He returned to the Redskins in 1978 as secondary coach under Jack Pardee.  From 1981 to 1992, he was the Redskins' defensive coordinator under head coach Joe Gibbs, either alone or sharing the job with Larry Peccatiello.  During this time period, Petitbon was considered one of the top coordinators in football.  When Gibbs initially retired in 1993, Petitbon was named his successor.  He did not find the same success as a head coach, lasting only one season.  Aging and underachieving, the team finished 4-12 and Petibon was dismissed by Redskins owner Jack Kent Cooke in favor of archrival Dallas Cowboys offensive coordinator Norv Turner.  Following his firing, Petitbon never took another job in the NFL.

His brother, John Petitbon, also played in the NFL.  Both Petitbon brothers are members of the Louisiana Sports Hall of Fame and the Louisiana High School Sports Hall of Fame.

Head coaching record

References

External links
 

1938 births
Living people
American football safeties
Chicago Bears players
Los Angeles Rams players
Tulane Green Wave football players
Washington Redskins players
Washington Redskins coaches
Washington Redskins head coaches
Western Conference Pro Bowl players
Coaches of American football from Louisiana
Players of American football from New Orleans